Absenticosta is an extinct genus of brachiopod found in Viséan strata in Mongolia and Argentina. It was a stationary epifaunal suspension feeder.

References 

Carboniferous brachiopods
Productida